Tāng is a Chinese surname. It is 72nd surname in the Hundred Family Surnames or Baijiaxing of the Song dynasty and 101st in modern popularity. The Tang (湯) family name traces its lineage from Tang of Shang, the first ruler of the Shang dynasty. In modern times the character can also mean "soup" or "broth".

Notable people
 Tang Xianzu (1550–1616), Chinese playwright
 Tang Enbo (1898–1954), Nationalist general in the Republic of China
 Tang Xiaodan (1910–2012), Chinese film director
 Tang Yuhan (1913–2014), Hong Kong doctor and oncologist
 Tang Yijie (1927–2014), Chinese scholar and professor
 John Tong Hon (born 1939), Chinese Roman Catholic cardinal and Bishop of Hong Kong
 Tang, Ming Yue, a news analyses, and an LGBT rights activist of Taiwan
 Tang, Lan hua, a female singer of Taiwan
 Ronny Tong (born 1950), Hong Kong politician
 Timothy Tong (born 1949), Hong Kong commissioner
 Kent Tong (born 1958), Hong Kong actor
 Tang Sulan (born 1965), Chinese writer and politician
 Angela Tong (born 1975), Hong Kong actress

 Tang Wei (born 7 October 1979) is a Chinese actress
 Katy Tang (9 July 1984) is a former American elected official in San Francisco, California
 Muhai Tang (born 1949 in Shanghai) is a Chinese conductor
 Tang Enbo a Nationalist general in the Republic of China
 Tang Jiali is a Chinese dancer and model
 Tang Yifen ca. 1778-1853 was a Chinese landscape painter and calligrapher during the Qing dynasty (1644–1912).
 Tang Can (born 12 June 1975) is a Chinese singer
 Tang Muli (born 1947 in Shanghai) is a Chinese painter and poet based in Montreal, Quebec, Canada
 Tang Tao (born May 1963) is a Chinese mathematician currently serving as President of BNU-HKBU United International College
 Tang Chao (physicist) ( born 1958) is a Chair Professor of Physics and Systems Biology at Peking University
 Tang He (1326–1395), courtesy name Dingchen, was a significant character in the rebellion that ended the Yuan dynasty and was one of the founding generals of Ming dynasty
 Tang Te-Chang (Chinese: 湯德章; 1907–1947) was a Taiwanese lawyer who was killed in the aftermath of the February 28th Incident

See also
Táng (surname) (唐)
Deng (surname) (鄧)
Teng (surname) (滕)

References

Chinese-language surnames
Individual Chinese surnames